Tjejtrampet was an annual road bicycle racing event which, as the name tells, was only for female participants. The events were held in Sweden by lagte May between 1990-2009. The race was held for first time on 13 May 1990 and was won by Marianne Berglund.

In 2006, the competitions were moved from Stockholm to Västerås.

Winners
1990: Marianne Berglund, Sweden
1991: Tea Vikstedt-Nyman, Finland
1992: Monique Knol, Netherlands
1993: Monique Knol, Netherlands
1994: Monique Knol, Netherlands
1995: Debby Mansveldl, Netherlands
1996: Monique Knol, Netherlands
1997: Jorunn Kvalø, Norway
1998: Susanne Ljungskog, Sweden
1999: Leoniten-Zilijaard van Moorsel, Netherlands
2000: Leoniten-Zilijaard van Moorsel, Netherlands
2001: Leoniten-Zilijaard van Moorsel, Netherlands
2002: Leoniten-Zilijaard van Moorsel, Netherlands
2003: Leoniten-Zilijaard van Moorsel, Netherlands
2004: Tina Nieminen, Finland
2005: Suzanne de Goede, Netherlands
2006: Hanna Isacsson, Sweden
2007: Monica Holler, CK Hymer, Sweden
2008: Kajsa Snihs, Alrikssons Cycle Team CK, Sweden
2009: Majken Lidén, Sweden
 2010: cancelled

References

See also
Tjejmilen
Tjejvasan

1990 establishments in Sweden
Cycle races in Sweden
June sporting events
May sporting events
Recurring sporting events established in 1990
International sports competitions in Stockholm
Sport in Västmanland County
Sport in Västerås
Women's sports competitions in Sweden